24 Hours with... is a TV show created by UK production company Hideous Productions for ITV. The shows Executive Producers are Spencer Austin and Harry Harrold, along with Paul Ross for co-production partners Twofour Broadcast.

24 Hours with... is a chat show format, as a celebrity and an interviewer spend an intense 24 hours locked in a room together.

Bobby Brown, Laurence Llewelyn-Bowen, Lee Ryan, David Gest, Stan Collymore, and Steve-O leave their mobile phones and PR advisers at the door for the first series in the UK. The host, Jamie Campbell, can ask them whatever he likes.

Each 30-minute show tells the story of their 24 hours in the hot seat, with a digital clock at the bottom of the screen marking the passing of the day.

In a bid to make room for poorly rating Tuesday night show Tycoon in its new Monday 10pm slot (from Monday 9 July), 24 Hours with... was removed from its slot.

No new time has yet been found for it, although an ITV spokeswoman said it would play out in the future. As of June 2012, ITV has yet to air the remaining episodes of 24 Hours with...

References

External links

2007 British television series debuts
ITV reality television shows